The Maldives national Under-23 football team, also known as Maldives Under-23s or Maldives U23(s), is considered to be the feeder team for the Maldives national football team, and is controlled by the Football Association of Maldives.

Asian Games

2002 

This was the Maldives U-23s' first competitive tournament. They were eliminated from the preliminary round, after being defeated 4–0 to South Korea, 3–1 to Malaysia and 5–0 to Oman. The only goal for the Maldives was scored by Ibrahim Fazeel.

2006 

In this year, Maldives were drawn to play in the Group A of the second round, alongside India, Hong Kong and Iran. Ashad Ali scored the only goal in the 3–1 loss against Iran. In the match against India, Ali Ashfaq scored the equalizing goal for Maldives, but they couldn't hold India till the end and lost for 2–1 as India scored the winning goal in the 89th minute of the game. The last match of the group was against Hong Kong. Maldives lost 1–0 to them as Maldives were conceded in the 11th minute of the game.

2010 

Maldives ended up the competition at the 3rd position of Group F in the 2010 Asian Games held at China. They lost the first match, 3–0 to Oman, but they managed to draw with a score of 0–0 against Pakistan and Thailand.

AFC U-22 Asian Cup

2014 AFC U-22 Asian Cup Qualification
In 2012 it was announced that Maldives U23 would participate in the qualifying round of the inaugural AFC U-22 Asian Cup in June 2012.

Competitive record

Olympic Games

*Denotes draws including knockout matches decided on penalty kicks.

Asian Games

*Denotes draws including knockout matches decided on penalty kicks.

AFC U-22 Asian Cup

*Denotes draws including knockout matches decided on penalty kicks.

H.E. Mahinda Rajapaksa U-23 International Football Trophy

*Denotes draws including knockout matches decided on penalty kicks.

Recent fixtures and results

2012

2013

2014

2015

Coaching staff

Current squad
The following players were called up to the squad for 2022 AFC U-23 Asian Cup qualification

Coaches

See also
 Maldives national football team

References

External links
Football Association of Maldives - Official website

Asian national under-23 association football teams
under-23